Beckman Institute may refer to any of five major research centers founded by the Arnold and Mabel Beckman Foundation in the 1980s:

 Beckman Center for Molecular and Genetic Medicine at Stanford University, Stanford, California
 Beckman Institute at Caltech, California Institute of Technology, Pasadena, California
 Beckman Institute for Advanced Science and Technology at the University of Illinois at Urbana-Champaign
 Beckman Laser Institute, University of California, Irvine, in Irvine, California
  Beckman Research Institute of the City of Hope National Medical Center in Duarte, California